Lewis Thomas was an American writer, physician, educator, policy advisor, and researcher.

Lewis Thomas may also refer to:

 Lewis Thomas (bishop) (died 1561), Bishop of Shrewsbury
 Lewis Cobden Thomas (1865–1928), Welsh international rugby union forward
 Lewis Thomas (politician) (1832–1913), colliery owner and politician in Queensland, Australia
 Lewis Thomas (footballer) (born 1997), Welsh goalkeeper for Forest Green Rovers

See also

Louis Thomas (disambiguation)